Igloolik Island is a small island in the Qikiqtaaluk Region of Nunavut, Canada. It is located in the Foxe Basin, very close to the Melville Peninsula (and to a lesser degree, Baffin Island), and it is often thought to be a part of the peninsula. It forms part of the Arctic Archipelago.

The word Igloolik (Inuktitut: "there is an igloo here") comes from iglu (meaning: "house"/"building") and refers to the sod houses (qarmaq) that were originally in the area. Inuit and their ancestors have inhabited the island since 2000 BC.  The archaeological sites on the island, which show a sequence up to 1000 AD, were designated a National Historic Site of Canada in 1978.

There is only one community on the island, also named Igloolik.

Qikiqtaarjuk
About 400 – 500 years ago Qikiqtaarjuk was a separate island but due to isostatic rebound it became part of the main island. Inuit Qaujimajatuqangit (traditional knowledge) says that prior to that there was an even smaller island called Puqtuniq from which the waters receded forming Qikiqtaarjuk. Qikiqtaarjuk is associated with several Inuit legends and stories and was the place from where Atanarjuat starts his run.

Climate
Igloolik has a polar climate (ET) with nine months averaging below . Winters are long and cold, with October being the snowiest month. Summers range from chilly to sometimes mild, with cold nights.

See also
 Arvia'juaq and Qikiqtaarjuk National Historic Site, near Arviat in Nunavut formerly, an island but Qikiqtaarjuk is now part of the mainland
 Qikiqtaarjuk

References 

National Historic Sites in Nunavut
Islands of Foxe Basin
Inhabited islands of Qikiqtaaluk Region